Top-seeded Billie Jean King defeated Ann Haydon-Jones 11–9, 6–4 in the final to win the women's singles tennis title at the 1967 U.S. National Championships.

Seeds
The seeded players are listed below. Billie Jean King is the champion; others show in brackets the round in which they were eliminated.

  Billie Jean King (champion)
  Ann Haydon-Jones (finalist)
  Françoise Dürr (semifinals)
  Nancy Richey (Withdrawn)
  Lesley Turner (semifinals)
  Maria Bueno (second round)
  Rosemary Casals (fourth round)
  Mary-Ann Eisel (third round)
  Virginia Wade (fourth round)
  Kerry Melville (fourth round)

Draw

Key
 Q = Qualifier
 WC = Wild card
 LL = Lucky loser
 r = Retired

Final eight

References

1967
1967 in women's tennis
1967 in American women's sports
Women's Singles